Ronald Louis Schwary (May 23, 1944 – July 2, 2020) was an Academy Award winning American producer and director.  Films that he was either producer or executive producer include Ordinary People for which he won an Academy Award for Best Picture, Havana, Scent of a Woman, Sabrina, Meet Joe Black and Random Hearts.

He also worked as a producer alongside Sidney Pollack in Absence of Malice and in Tootsie, which was nominated for an Academy Award for Best Picture in 1983. He received another Academy Award for Best Picture nomination for A Soldier's Story in 1985 as well.

Schwary did not receive a Best Picture nomination for Scent of a Woman in 1992, which was both nominated for Oscars and Golden Globes for best picture, since he was the executive producer and the academy only recognized those credited solely as producers.

Schwary was also the producer of the Rolling Stones documentary Lets Spend the Night Together in 1982. Schwary served as an executive producer on the Barbra Streisand directed film The Mirror Has Two Faces. From 2005 to 2011 he produced the Medium TV series.

Personal life 
Schwary was in The Dalles, Oregon, the son of Mitchell Schwary (1903- 1986) who was a real estate broker and Lorraine Ablan. Schwary was of Lebanese descent and both his paternal and maternal grandparents were born in Lebanon. He attended the University of Oregon but transferred to the University of Southern California where he graduated in 1967. At USC, Schwary became friends with actor John Wayne who was a USC alumni who got him a job as a stand-in for Dustin Hoffman in The Graduate. Schwary worked as an assistant director in the 1970s and later as a production manager.

He was married to Emmy-nominated hairstylist Susan Carol Schwary from 1971 to 1994. Both of their sons, Brian and Neil Schwary, work in the film industry. Schwary was married to Karen Feldman from 2009 to 2014.

Schwary died on July 2, 2020 from a rare neurological disease.

Filmography
He was a producer in all films unless otherwise noted.

Film

Second unit director or assistant director

Production manager

As an actor

Miscellaneous crew

Television

Second unit director or assistant director

As director

Production manager

Thanks

References

External links
 

American film producers
2020 deaths
1944 births
Golden Globe Award-winning producers
American people of Lebanese descent
Producers who won the Best Picture Academy Award
Neurological disease deaths in California